Miss India Worldwide 2014 was the 23rd edition of the Miss India Worldwide pageant, held on 20 June 2014. The event was held at Al Raha Beach Resort in Abu Dhabi, United Arab Emirates.

Nehal Bhogaita of the United Kingdom crowned her successor Monica Gill of United States at the end of the event.

Results

Special awards

Contestants 
40 contestants competed for the title of Miss India Worldwide 2014.

 – Jessica Sonejee
 – Swetha Raj 
 – Priya D'Silva
 – Harpreet Kaur
 – Kajol Panchal
 – Laxmi Bhandari
 – Ritu Shah
 – Mauree Ornella
 – Joanna Soudine-Palton
 – Nieves Gautam Nagpal
 – Noopoor Akruwala
 – Laurence Jiounandan
 – Divya Sieudarsan
 – Anugya Sharma
 – Mansi Sharma
 – Revan Satinder 
 – Komal Karsan Halai 
 – Rachel Bianca Salema
 – Dhiva Sakti Yogandran
 – Coralie Couta 
 – Shyanshini Sunnassee
 – Janine Habib
 – Amreeta Goundar
 – Sonia Singh
 – Niharika Pathak
 – Trisha Verma 
 – Priscilla Martin
 – Kiran Jivnani
 – Gabriella Seekola
 – Angie Shamdasani
 – Shima Singh Mann
 – Yaddisha Dulangi Peterson
 – Darshani Khodabaks
 – Cynferth Turrian
 – Nida Kamaal 
 – Shriveta Balram
 – Ruchi Vohra 
 – Sanna Monga
 – Suhani Gandhi
 – Monica Gill

Judges 
The Miss India Worldwide 2014 final judges were:

Harbajan Singh - Cricketeer
Neha Dhupia - Actress and model, winner of Femina Miss India Universe 2002.
Richa Chadda - Actress
Nikhil Dwivedi - Actor
Sundeep Koachar - Astrologer
Meghana Fareed - Radio presenter
Dharmatma Saran - Dharmatma Saran, chairman and founder of Miss India Worldwide and Mrs. India Worldwide.

Crossovers
Contestants who previously competed or will compete at other beauty pageants:

 – Swetha Raj, Miss India Australia, won the title of Miss India Pacific Supertalent of the World 2014 in Seoul, South Korea.
 – Divya Sieudarsan, Miss India Guyana, had completed at Miss Guyana Universe 2009. She has finished 2nd runner-up at Miss India Guyana 2011. 
 – Komal Halai, Miss India Kenya, had finished 1st runner-up at Miss India UK 2014 and Miss India Europe UK 2014. She had completed at Miss India Europe 2014 and won the award of Miss Best Personality 
 – Dhiva Sakti Yogandran, Miss India Malaysia, had completed at Miss World Malaysia 2015 and won the award of Miss Photogenic.
 – Priscilla Martin, Miss Singapore India, was Miss Singapore Global Beauty Queen 2016.
 – Darshani Khodabaks, Miss India Suriname, was Miss Multiverse India 2012 and Miss Heritage Netherlands 2016.
 - Suhani Gandhi, Miss India UK, was previously Miss India Europe UK. She placed as the 2nd runner-up at Miss India Europe 2014.

References

External links
Miss India Worldwide

2014 beauty pageants
2014 in the United Arab Emirates